Siddharth Anil Shirole (born 4 February 1979) is an Indian politician of the Bharatiya Janata Party (BJP) and first time Member of Maharashtra Legislative Assembly representing the Shivajinagar Vidhansabha Constituency from Pune.

Shirole is also the Councillor for Ward 14 (Deccan Gymkhana – Model Colony) of the Pune Municipal Corporation. Shirole is also the Director of Pune Mahanagar Parivahan Mahamandal Limited and National Finance Head of the Bharatiya Janata Yuva Morcha.

He is the son of Anil Shirole, the former Member of Parliament of Lok Sabha from Pune.
He belongs to the very well-known Shiledar Shirole (Patil) family of Shivajinagar, Pune.

Professionally, Shirole heads the Parichay Group of Hotels and Restaurants, which owns the multi-award-winning restaurant Shabree, Hotel Parichay, Shavaree Restaurant and Zaika Spice IceCream.

Shirole is also the author of the widely loved self-help book Today is my Favourite Day: Unleashing the Power of Optimism published by Wisdom Tree.

Shirole represented India in the prestigious International Visitor Leadership Program U.S. Department of State's premier professional exchange program
for International Opinion Leaders, whose notable alumni from India include ex-president Pratibha Patil, ex-president Kocheril Raman Narayanan, former prime minister Atal Bihari Vajpayee, former prime minister Indira Gandhi and former prime minister Morarji Desai.

References

MyNeta
Maharashtra election result winners full list: Names of winning candidates of BJP, Congress, Shiv Sena, NCP
Maharashtra election results: Full list of winners from BJP, Shiv Sena, Congress, NCP

1979 births
Living people
Bharatiya Janata Party politicians from Maharashtra
People from Pune
Maharashtra MLAs 2019–2024